Sudet ("Wolves" in English) is a sports club from Kouvola, Finland, playing bandy and association football. The club was formed in 1912 and was based firstly in Viipuri (Vyborg), then in Helsinki, before finally moving to Kouvola.

Sudet formerly played in the Bandyliiga, the top bandy league in Finland, and has become Finnish champions many times. As of 2014, the club is the reigning national champion in women's bandy. Sudet currently plays football in the Kolmonen (Fourth Division) and their home ground is at the Keskusurheilukenttä, Kouvola.  The Club Chairman is Vesa Vainio.

History
Sudet were originally established in Viipuri (Vyborg) on 13 December 1912 under the name Wiipurin Bandy & Jalkapalloseura (WB & JS). The name was changed in 1924 to Wiipurin Sudet.  In 1940 the Winter War resulted in the club moving to Helsinki as the city of Viipuri fell into Soviet hands. From 1950 the name was changed to its current form, Sudet. In 1962 the club made its final move to Kouvola.

In the early decades of the twentieth century WB & JS were very successful at bandy winning their first Finnish Championship in 1914. The club won no fewer than six consecutive Finnish Championships and has won 14 in total as of 2014. In 2014, the women's bandy team of Sudet claimed the women's national championship for the first time.

Sudet also made great progress at football and reached the semi-finals of the Finnish Championship in 1924, 1925, 1928 and 1929.  They were promoted to the new Mestaruussarja at the end of the 1930 season.

In total the club played 15 seasons in the Finnish Football Championship (Mestaruussarja) in 1931–38, 1940/41-46/47, 1948 and 1951. On 28 July 1940 Sudet won the Finnish Championship by beating TPS Turku 2–0 in the Final. The Mestaruussarja could not be played as a league in 1940 so a cup competition was held instead.

Sudet played 18 seasons in the Suomensarja (Finland League), the second tier of Finnish football in 1939, 1947/48, 1949–50, 1952–61 and 1963–66.  They also have had two spells in the third tier, the Kakkonen (the Second Division), in 1981 and 1985–90.

Sudet's recent history has been less spectacular.  After a period of inactivity in the 1990s the club was revived in 2001 following a cooperative venture with Kymen Salibandy and FC Kouvola.  Sudet is now a strong club, which has benefited by an increase of around 300 in the number of members.

The club currently remains in the Kolmonen (Third Division) but their potential was demonstrated in the 2010 Finnish Cup when they battled their way through to the Sixth Round before going down 0–1 at home to FC Haka from the Veikkausliiga watched by 514 spectators.

The highest ever attendance for a Sudet match was in 1937 in Viipuri when 3,264 people attended the home game with Turun Palloseura.

Divisional Movements since 1930
– Sudet Viipuri until 1944
– Sudet Helsinki from 1945 to 1961
– Sudet Kouvola since 1962

Top Level (15 seasons): 1931–38, 1940/41-46/47, 1948, 1951
Second Level (18 seasons): 1939, 1947/48, 1949–50, 1952–61, 1963–66
Third Level (7 seasons): 1981, 1985–90

Season to season

Club Structure
Sudet run 3 men's teams, 1 ladies team, 12 boys teams and 7 girls teams.  In addition the FC Arosudet and FC Hukat clubs form part of the Sudet structure.  The club also run a football school for youngsters.

2010 season
Sudet Men's Team are competing in the Kolmonen (Third Division) administered by the Kaakkois-Suomi SPL.  This is the fourth highest tier in the Finnish football system. In 2009 STPS finished in third place in the Kolmonen.

Sudet/2 and Sudet Pure Amis are participating in the Kutonen (Sixth Division) administered by the Kaakkois-Suomi SPL. They are both new teams.

Current squad 2016

References and sources
Official Website
Finnish Wikipedia
Suomen Cup
Suomen Cup

Footnotes

Bandy clubs in Finland
Football clubs in Finland
Kouvola
Bandy clubs established in 1912
Association football clubs established in 1912
1912 establishments in Finland